Fredrik Olof Esaias Stoor (born 28 February 1984) is a Swedish former professional footballer who played as a right-back. He was capped 11 times playing for Sweden, and played for Hammarby, Rosenborg, Fulham, Derby County, Vålerenga, Lillestrøm, Viborg FF, and IF Brommapojkarna. He represented Sweden at UEFA Euro 2008.

Early life
Stoor was born in Sweden to Finnish parents from Vaasa, Esa Siekkinen and Margaret Stoor.

Club career

Hammarby
Stoor was born in Stockholm, Sweden, and started playing with Hammarby, who he joined in 1996 at the age of 12 as a youth player. In January 2001, he had a trial with Manchester United. During his professional career at the club he made 51 appearances and scored two goals from defence.

Rosenborg
In December 2006, he joined Norwegian club Rosenborg and made 46 appearances for the first team, including seven appearances in European competition.

Fulham, and Derby County loan
Stoor joined Premier League club Fulham during the summer 2008 transfer window. He made his debut on 27 August 2008 against Leicester City, when he started in the League Cup second round tie.

In September 2009, Stoor joined Derby County for an initial one-month loan, appearing four times. He sufficiently impressed Derby for his loan to be extended for a further two months.

Return to Norway
Stoor returned to Norway in January 2011, when he signed for Vålerenga as a free agent. After playing 15 matches for Vålerenga in Tippeligaen, he was wanted by his former club Rosenborg ahead of the 2012 season, but he did not pass the medical test in Trondheim. Just before the Norwegian transfer window closed in March 2012, Stoor joined Lillestrøm on a season-long loan-deal. His contract with Vålerenga was terminated ahead of the 2013 season, and Stoor subsequently signed a one-year contract with Lillestrøm.

Viborg FF
On 23 January 2014, Stoor signed a six-month contract with Danish Superliga club Viborg FF, joining on a free transfer.

International career
A full Swedish international in 2008, Stoor was part of the squad that took part in UEFA Euro 2008 and made 11 appearances for Sweden.

Career statistics

References

External links
 yahoo-Eurosport profile
 
 

1984 births
Living people
Footballers from Stockholm
Swedish footballers
Sweden international footballers
Sweden youth international footballers
Association football defenders
Hammarby Fotboll players
Rosenborg BK players
Fulham F.C. players
Derby County F.C. players
Vålerenga Fotball players
Lillestrøm SK players
Viborg FF players
IF Brommapojkarna players
Allsvenskan players
Eliteserien players
Premier League players
English Football League players
Swedish expatriate footballers
Expatriate footballers in England
Expatriate footballers in Norway
Expatriate men's footballers in Denmark
Swedish expatriate sportspeople in England
Swedish expatriate sportspeople in Norway
Swedish expatriate sportspeople in Denmark
UEFA Euro 2008 players
Swedish people of Finnish descent